Saint Amatus may refer to:
 St. Aimé, died 690 
 St. Ame, died 630 
 Amatus of Nusco (c. 1003 – 1093), first bishop of Nusco in Irpinia, southern Italy